Karagichevsky is a rural locality (a khutor) in Mikhaylovka Urban Okrug, Volgograd Oblast, Russia. The population was 1,331 as of 2010. There are 39 streets.

Geography 
Karagichevsky is located 36 km northwest of Mikhaylovka. Krutinsky is the nearest rural locality.

References 

Rural localities in Mikhaylovka urban okrug